Pleasure Island may refer to :

Amusement parks
 Pleasure Island (Walt Disney World), in Orlando, Florida, U.S.
 Pleasure Island (Massachusetts amusement park) (closed 1969), U.S.
 Pleasure Island (Muskegon, Michigan water park) (closed 1991), U.S.
 Pleasure Island Family Theme Park (closed 2016), in North East Lincolnshire, England

Other uses
 Pleasure Island (North Carolina), U.S., a coastal barrier island
 Pleasure Island (Pinocchio), a fictional location

See also

 The Girls of Pleasure Island, a 1953 film
 Nauru, formerly known as Pleasant Island